Kleinbirkach is a village located in Upper Franconia, Bavaria, Germany, and is a part of the town of Ebrach. It is most well known for its proximity to the Dreifrankenstein. Its current population is 29.

References

Villages in Bavaria